The Church of St. Nicholas or Karlovac Cathedral, is a Serbian Orthodox church located in Karlovac, in central Croatia. The original church (destroyed in 1993) was finished in 1787, and was dedicated to Saint Nicholas. In 2007, the church was completely renovated.

History

The local Serbian community collected money for today's church in 1781 and a request for permission to build it sent to authorities in 1784. Permission for construction was granted and work started in 1785. The church was completed in 1787 and worship began in 1803.

Land was purchased for 3,000 Forints and 12 Ducats. The construction supervisor and architect for the new church was Josip Štiler. Construction costs were 30,000 Forints which were collected by the members of the local church municipality and by Serb merchants from Karlovac and Trieste. Arsa Teodorović painted icons for the church's iconostasis and the building was sanctified by Bishop Petar Jovanović in 1803.

The church was devastated during World War II, and then again in 1991, during the Croatian War of Independence, when mines were detonated inside the church by Croatian forces. The church was repeatedly blown up and robbed until final destruction in 1993.

The facility was completely renovated in 2007. At 7 January 2012, on the Serbian Orthodox Church's Christmas liturgy, Croatian President Ivo Josipović visited the church.

See also
Eparchy of upper Karlovac
Karlovac
Serbs of Croatia
List of Serbian Orthodox churches in Croatia

References

Serbian Orthodox church buildings in Croatia
Buildings and structures in Karlovac County
Churches completed in 1787
Destroyed churches in Croatia
1787 establishments in the Habsburg monarchy
Rebuilt churches
Rebuilt buildings and structures in Croatia
18th-century churches in Croatia
18th-century Serbian Orthodox church buildings